The Rheinmetall 12 cm leFH 08 was a howitzer used by Norway in World War II. It was known in Norwegian service as the 12 cm felthaubits/m09. Captured guns were given a German designation after the Invasion of Norway as the 12 cm leFH 375(n). Two batteries of Artillerie-Abteilung 477, which served in Finland during the war, were equipped with 12 cm Norwegian howitzers, which might have included these guns.

The gun was license produced in Belgium as the Canon de 155 Mle 1913.

References 
 Gander, Terry and Chamberlain, Peter. Weapons of the Third Reich: An Encyclopedic Survey of All Small Arms, Artillery and Special Weapons of the German Land Forces 1939-1945. New York: Doubleday, 1979 
 Chamberlain, Peter & Gander, Terry. Heavy Artillery. New York: Arco, 1975

External links
 Norwegian artillery on Norway 1940
 Independent Artillery Units on Panzerkeil

120 mm artillery
Howitzers
World War II artillery of Norway